The Guns of Fort Petticoat is a 1957 American Western film produced by Harry Joe Brown and Audie Murphy for Brown-Murphy Pictures. It was based on the 1955 short story "Petticoat Brigade" by Chester William Harrison (1913–1994) that he expanded into a novelization for the film's release. It was directed by George Marshall, distributed by Columbia Pictures and filmed at the Iverson Movie Ranch and at Old Tucson.

The fictional story tells the tale of an Army deserter training a disparate group of women to become Indian fighters climaxing in a Battle of the Alamo-type action.

Plot
In 1864, during the American Civil War, Texan Lt. Frank Hewitt (Audie Murphy) is serving with the U.S. Cavalry under Colonel John Chivington. On patrol, Hewitt meets a group of unarmed Indians who are returning to the Sand Creek reservation that they were not supposed to leave. While being briefed by Hewitt, the colonel orders the attack known to history as the Sand Creek Massacre. Hewitt not only disagrees with the punishment of the Indians, but realizes they will use the attack as an excuse to unite and spread terror throughout the Southwest, including his own hometown in Texas, which has sent most of its men to fight for the Confederacy. Colonel Chivington sees Indian attacks on Texas, which will create havoc in the Confederacy, as a bonus. Violently objecting, Hewitt is placed under arrest and confined to quarters.

Hewitt deserts to warn the Texans but is hated and ignored as a traitor by his now-Confederate former neighbors, who despise him for serving with the Union. No one believes him until he brings home the dead body of a woman murdered by Comanches who have joined the uprising. Hewitt organizes a brigade of women and trains them in marksmanship and combat tactics. Armed and given military ranks, Hewitt and the women seize the day and hold on to the only safety they have in an abandoned mission (Fort Petticoat). The "blue-belly traitor" Hewitt and the petticoat brigade are deserted by the only remaining man; they fight off scavengers and Comanches as they struggle to build trust and work together during the ensuing attacks. As the final gunfight ends, Hewitt and his greatest female critic fall in star-crossed love left over from childhood memories. But Hewitt cannot reciprocate because as an honorable soldier he must return to his post at Sand Creek and face charges for desertion. As Hewitt is being renounced as a deserter and a liar for his most fantastic story of helping to rescue the women in Texas and training them to fight off Comanches, Col. Chivington's commanding general happened to enter the trial room. As the guilty sentence and execution is about to be pronounced, his female confederates return the favor, marching armed into the trial to stop the proceeding. The commanding general, in a surge of sentimental good will, orders a surrender to the armed ladies who have saved the day and proved Hewitt's truthfulness. Hewitt's testimony snares Col. Chivington (who is relieved of command and ordered held for trial) and his hopes in his new-found Confederate love are restored.

Cast
 Audie Murphy as 1st Lt. Frank Hewitt
 Kathryn Grant as Anne Martin
 Hope Emerson as Hannah Lacey
 Jeff Donnell as Mary Wheller
 Jeanette Nolan as Cora Melavan
 Sean McClory as Emmett Kettle
 Ernestine Wade as Hetty
 Peggy Maley as Lucy Conover
 Isobel Elsom as Mrs. Charlotte Ogden
   Patricia Tiernan as Stella Leatham (as Patricia Livingston)
   Kim Charney as Bax Leatham
 Ray Teal as Salt Pork
 Nestor Paiva as Tortilla
 James Griffith as Kipper
 Ainslie Pryor as Col. John Chivington
 Hugh Sanders as Sgt. Webber
   Al Wyatt, Sr. as Sgt. Lebbard

Production
The novel Guns of Fort Petticoat was published in March 1956.

In July 1955 Murphy announced he would make the film, which then had the working title Petticoat Brigade, after The World in My Corner and a biopic of Charles Marion Russell. He called the movie a "Destry-style Western."
Murphy produced the movie through Brown-Murphy Pictures, which he had set up with producer Harry Joe Brown. On November 9, 1955, Murphy signed a contract with Walt Disney Productions and Brown-Murphy Pictures to appear in two films, of which this was the first. Disney wanted Murphy to make another movie; Murphy, who had the right to select stories, submitted proposals to appear in adaptations of Peer Gynt by Henrik Ibsen and The Idiot by Dostoevski. Brown accused Murphy of trying to get out of his contract and sued him for $1 million.

The working title of the film was Petticoat Brigade; screenwriter and television director Walter Doniger was originally set to have directed the film.

Aline MacMahon was to appear in the cast but found the role too strenuous. She was replaced by Hope Emerson. Lucy Marlow was cast in a key role then dropped out and was replaced by Patricia Livingston.

References

External links
 
 
 
 
 The Guns of Fort Petticoat at Audie Murphy Memorial Site

1957 films
1957 Western (genre) films
American Western (genre) films
Audie Murphy
Columbia Pictures films
Fiction set in 1864
Films based on short fiction
Films directed by George Marshall
Western (genre) cavalry films
1950s English-language films
1950s American films